Laura Kay Berg (born January 6, 1975) is an American college softball head coach for Oregon State and a former collegiate four-time All-American and Olympian. She played for the Fresno State Bulldogs from 1994–98, where she won the 1998 Women's College World Series and owns the Western Athletic Conference career records in hits, runs and triples. She is one of only four women to have won four Olympic medals in softball, having won a medal at every Olympics the sport was contested. She is second all-time in NCAA Division I career hits and at-bats. She is also a USA Softball Hall of Fame honoree.

Fresno State
Berg was born in Whittier, California and raised in nearby Santa Fe Springs, graduating from Santa Fe High School in 1993.  Berg and her twin sister enrolled at Fresno State and started for the school's softball team. In her first season, she was named a National Fastpitch Coaches Association Third Team All-American. The Bulldogs made it to the WCWS and took their first game before dropping back-to-back shutout games against eventual champions the Arizona Wildcats and the Oklahoma State Cowgirls on May 27, 1994. Berg had two hits in the tournament.

As a sophomore, Berg would earn First Team All-American honors while hitting over .400 and setting a new school season record for triples, which also led the WAC conference. She currently still claims that record.

After red-shirting to compete at the 1996 Atlanta Olympics, Berg returned and once again earned NFCA First Team honors. She joined school elite with top-5 season records in batting average, hits (led the WAC), doubles and triples. She also managed to reach the 7th best season hits total all-time for an NCAA season, which now ranks in the top-15.

In her second WCWS appearance, Berg and the Bulldogs were shutout in their first game but rebounded strongly by winning their next three including shutting out eventual champion Arizona Wildcats in the semifinals. Berg hit a double and scored the eventual winning run. In the second game of the doubleheader, Berg singled in her first two at-bats and scored each time to take the lead, however, Arizona tied the score immediately and went on to win 6–3 on May 25, 1997.

For her senior campaign, Berg was named 1998 First Team All-American for a final time. The senior achieved a career best batting average (led the WAC as well as a school record in runs. Her stolen bases ranked top-5 for a Bulldog season. Beginning April 17 until May 8, Berg would go on a 29 consecutive game hit streak, a career best and the NCAA's 6th best all-time.

Returning to the WCWS, the team began its march by defeating the Nebraska Cornhuskers 6–1 on May 21 with Berg scoring the eventual winning run. They mercy ruled Michigan Wolverines before losing to the Washington Huskies in the semifinals on May 24. Berg and teammates responded by besting the Huskies by 5 runs in the rematch, Berg led off with a single and helped stake the Bulldogs to a first-inning two-run lead to make it into their school's 5th finals appearance.

Berg had a hit and won the title on teammate Nina Lindenberg's solo home run to defeat the two-time defending champions the Arizona Wildcats. For the tournament, Berg hit .470 (8/17) with 2 RBIs to be named All-Tournament.

Berg would graduate as the school career record holder in hits, triples, runs and stolen bases. She also was tops in conference career hits, triples, runs, at-bats as well as the third best average all-time. Her NCAA career puts her second in hits and at-bats all-time for a career.

National team
Berg would also join the United States national team in 1994, participating in the 1994 ISF Women's World Championship, where the US team won the gold medal.  Berg redshirted at Fresno State in 1996, the year that she won her first Olympic gold at the 1996 Atlanta Olympics. In 1998, she won her second gold medal at the world championships.  At the 1999 Pan American Games Berg performed well in the gold medal effort, batting .375 for the tournament with 15 hits.  In the 2000 Summer Olympics Berg drove in the winning run in the 8th inning of the gold medal game.

From 2000 to 2003 she participated at tournaments with the national team.  She added gold medals at the 2002 World Championships and 2003 Pan American Games to her resume, batting .471 in the Pan-Americans.  In the 2004 Athens Olympics she started eight of the nine games, batting .368, and held a perfect fielding average.  In the gold medal game on August 23, Berg had a hit in the eventual win over Australia. In 2006 Berg won her fourth consecutive World Championship in Beijing. Berg's four World Championship appearances is a record for the event.

In 2007 Berg returned to her third Pan American Games, where she won another gold medal, and was chosen to carry the U.S. flag during the closing ceremonies.  At the 2008 Summer Olympics, she captured a silver medal with the Team USA, the only time in Olympic history the United States did not win the gold medal. Berg did not play in the gold medal game but did hit .500 for the tournament highlighted by a diving catch to save Monica Abbott's perfect game vs. the Netherlands on August 17. After the finals, Berg along with teammates retired from international competition.

Coaching
Berg joined the staff at the Oregon State Beavers program in 2011. In 2012, she helped coach them to a regional appearance.

She was named Oregon State's head coach on August 27, 2012.

Personal life
Berg was an assistant coach at Fresno State from 2000–2003, as she continuing to participate with Team USA. She returned to her alma mater coaching staff for 2005 and 2006 seasons. Eventually she left her post to train with the national team. Berg was invited to be an assistant coach with Team USA in 2012, helping them win a World Cup.

In 2006, Berg was named to 25th Anniversary WCWS Team. In 2012, she along with her 2004 Team USA teammates were named to the Olympics Hall of Fame.

Awards and honors
2005 International Sports Invitational Champion
2001 Played for WPSL Gold Professional Team consisting of 2000 Olympians
WAC Champions – Fresno State
Second FSU player to record 100 or more hits in a season
4-Time NFCA  All-American (3 First-Team; Third-Team)
4-Time NCAA All-Regional Team
25th WCWS Anniversary Team
Olympic Hall of Fame (2004 Team USA)
Fresno County Athletic Hall of Fame (2009)

Statistics

Fresno State Bulldogs

Team USA

Head Coaching Record

See also
NCAA Division I softball career .400 batting average list

References

External links
 
 
 
 
 
 

1975 births
Living people
Softball players from California
American softball coaches
Fresno State Bulldogs softball players
Olympic softball players of the United States
Olympic gold medalists for the United States in softball
Olympic silver medalists for the United States in softball
Softball coaches from California
Oregon State Beavers softball coaches
Softball players at the 1996 Summer Olympics
Softball players at the 2000 Summer Olympics
Softball players at the 2004 Summer Olympics
Softball players at the 2007 Pan American Games
Softball players at the 2008 Summer Olympics
Fresno State Bulldogs softball coaches
Medalists at the 2008 Summer Olympics
Medalists at the 2004 Summer Olympics
Medalists at the 2000 Summer Olympics
Medalists at the 1996 Summer Olympics
Pan American Games gold medalists for the United States
People from Santa Fe Springs, California
Pan American Games medalists in softball
Sportspeople from Whittier, California
United States women's national softball team coaches
Medalists at the 1999 Pan American Games
Medalists at the 2003 Pan American Games
Medalists at the 2007 Pan American Games